Elizabeth Haydon (born 1965) is an American fantasy author. She has written two fantasy series set within the same universe, the fantasy/romance/whodunit fusion called The Symphony of Ages and the young adult series The Lost Journals of Ven Polypheme.

An herbalist, harpist, and madrigal singer, Elizabeth Haydon also enjoys anthropology and folklore. She lives on the East Coast of the United States.

Bibliography

The Symphony of Ages 

The Symphony of Ages books series consists of the Rhapsody Trilogy, the two Middle Books, and, as of June 2015, The War of the Known World Trilogy. The third book in this trilogy, and thus the eighth in the Symphony of Ages series, was published in June 2015.

The Rhapsody Trilogy 
The Rhapsody Trilogy is based on three characters who find themselves in a land on the brink of disaster.  Rhapsody, the main character, is a Namer, a profession that includes passing down the history and lore of the people and the land. As a Namer, Rhapsody, can only speak the truth. A Namer has incredible power because when they speak (or sing) they describe the very nature or essence of a person or a thing. In some instances a Namer can change the parameters of a person or a thing by giving it a new name. When Rhapsody meets up with her two future companions she accidentally uses her Naming power to rename The Brother, a ruthless assassin, to "Achmed The Snake." This accident forces Rhapsody to join Achmed and his companion who are on the run from an ancient and dangerous foe, a F'Dor demon.

 Rhapsody: Child of Blood (1999)
 Prophecy: Child of Earth (2001)
 Destiny: Child of the Sky (2002)

The Bridge/Middle Duology
Rhapsody, Achmed, Grunthor live out their new lives after the aftermath of the Cymrian Council. Achmed and Grunthor continue their plans to re-build Ylorc while Rhapsody lives with Ashe in Haguefort, unknown that an enemy thought dead has arisen to wreck vengeance.

 Requiem for the Sun (2003)
 Elegy for a Lost Star (2004)

The War of the Known World Trilogy 
The War of the Known World trilogy focuses on the Three facing war that is started by the Merchant turned Emperor Talquist, who used the scale of Twilight to manipulate the scales to rise to power. Various other characters are introduced and supporting characters make a stronger appearance in the trilogy, at the heart of it all Rhapsody must come forth from being a mother to being the Iliachenva’ar once again in order to save her friends and family from annihilation.

 The Assassin King (2006)
 The Merchant Emperor (2014)
 The Hollow Queen (2015)

The Series Concluding Novel 

 The Weaver's Lament (2016)

The Lost Journals of Ven Polypheme 

 The Floating Island (2006)
 The Thief Queen's Daughter (2007)
 The Dragon's Lair (2009)
 The Tree of Water (2014)
 The Star of the Sea (unknown)

Compendiums 
 Legends II - "Threshold" (Short Story)
 Emerald Magic: Great Tales of Irish Fantasy - "The Merrow" (Short Story)

References

External links
Elizabeth Haydon Interview at SFFWorld.com

Elizabeth Haydon Fan Site on Facebook
Elizabeth Haydon on Facebook

1965 births
Living people
American fantasy writers
American women novelists
Women science fiction and fantasy writers
20th-century American novelists
21st-century American novelists
20th-century American women writers
21st-century American women writers
Date of birth missing (living people)
Place of birth missing (living people)